Stella Christoforou (born 2 March 1992) is a Cypriot long-distance runner. In 2020, she competed in the women's half marathon at the 2020 World Athletics Half Marathon Championships held in Gdynia, Poland.

References

External links 
 

Living people
1992 births
Place of birth missing (living people)
Cypriot female long-distance runners
Cypriot female middle-distance runners
Cypriot female marathon runners